This is a list of people who have served as Custos Rotulorum of Brecknockshire.

 Sir William Vaughan c. 1544
 Sir Roger Vaughan bef. 1558–1571
 Richard Price bef. 1573–1586/1587
 Sir Robert Knollys bef. 1594 – aft. 1608
 Sir Henry Williams 1617–1636
 Henry Williams 1636–1642
 Howell Gwynne 1642–1646
 Interregnum
 Sir William Lewis, Bt 1660–1677
 Sir Thomas Williams, Bt 1677–1679
 The Duke of Beaufort 1679–1689
 Sir Rowland Gwynne 1689
 The Earl of Macclesfield 1689–1694
 The Lord Herbert of Chirbury 1695–1702
 The Lord Ashburnham 1702–1710
 The Lord Ashburnham 1710
 The Lord Ashburnham 1710–1723
 William Morgan 1723–1731
For later custodes rotulorum, see Lord Lieutenant of Brecknockshire.

References
Institute of Historical Research - Custodes Rotulorum 1544-1646
Institute of Historical Research - Custodes Rotulorum 1660-1828

Brecknockshire